Edward Alcott Neary (February 6, 1892 – July 28, 1941) was an American football and basketball player and coach. He served as the head football coach at the University of Rochester in 1916 and 1919 and was head coach of the school's basketball team during the 1918–19 season. Prior to coaching at Rochester, Neary served as the head basketball coach at Fordham University during the 1914–15 season.  Neary died on July 28, 1941, in Rochester, New York, after suffering from heat-induced heart failure in his parked car.

Head coaching record

Football

References

External links
 

1892 births
1941 deaths
American football quarterbacks
American men's basketball players
Forwards (basketball)
Fordham Rams athletic directors
Fordham Rams men's basketball coaches
Rochester Yellowjackets football coaches
Rochester Yellowjackets football players
Rochester Yellowjackets men's basketball coaches
Rochester Yellowjackets men's basketball players
People from Gouverneur, New York
Sportspeople from Rochester, New York
Players of American football from New York (state)
Basketball players from New York (state)
Accidental deaths in New York (state)